Hunter Drew Strickland (born September 24, 1988) is an American professional baseball pitcher in the Cincinnati Reds organization. He has played in Major League Baseball (MLB) for the San Francisco Giants, Seattle Mariners, Washington Nationals, New York Mets, Tampa Bay Rays, Los Angeles Angels, and Milwaukee Brewers.

Early life
Strickland was born in Thomaston, Georgia.

Career

Boston Red Sox
Strickland was drafted by the Boston Red Sox in the 18th round, 564th overall pick, of the 2007 Major League Baseball draft. He made his professional debut with the GCL Red Sox, logging a 6.04 ERA in 9 appearances. The next year, he played for the Low-A Lowell Spinners, and pitched to a 5-3 record and 3.18 ERA in 15 games. He was assigned to the Single-A Greenville Drive to begin the 2009 season, and posted a 5-4 record and 3.35 ERA in 83.1 innings of work.

Pittsburgh Pirates
On July 22, 2009, Strickland was traded to the Pittsburgh Pirates along with Argenis Díaz in exchange for Adam LaRoche. He finished the year with the Single-A West Virginia Power, registering a 4-2 record and 3.77 ERA in 8 games. He split the 2010 season between West Virginia and the High-A Bradenton Marauders, accumulating a 2-5 record and 5.53 ERA with 25 strikeouts. However, his season was cut short due to a right elbow strain. He missed the entire 2011 season with a rotator cuff injury that required surgery. In 2012, he split the year between the Double-A Altoona Curve and Bradenton, logging a 4-4 record and 3.70 ERA with 58 strikeouts in 33 appearances. On November 20, 2012, the Pirates added Strickland to the 40-man roster to protect him from the Rule 5 draft. On March 27, 2013, Strickland was designated for assignment by the Pirates.

San Francisco Giants
On April 2, 2013, Strickland was claimed off waivers by the San Francisco Giants. Strickland underwent Tommy John surgery in May and was designated for assignment on July 23, 2013, and released the next day, but re-signed on a minor league contract with the Giants 5 days later. He was re-added to the Giants' 40-man roster on November 20, 2013.

2014
After recording a 2.02 ERA in 38 appearances for the Double-A Richmond Flying Squirrels, Strickland was called up to the majors for the first time on September 1, 2014.  He pitched one scoreless inning of relief against the Colorado Rockies later that day.  In the 2014 regular season, Strickland appeared in 9 games, allowing 5 hits and no runs in 7.0 innings pitched.

In Game 1 of the 2014 National League Division Series versus the Washington Nationals, Strickland entered the game with the bases loaded and two outs in the sixth inning and struck out Ian Desmond to preserve the Giants' lead.  In Game 2, Strickland recorded the save in the longest (by time, tied for longest in innings) playoff game in Major League history, as the Giants defeated the Nationals 2–1 in 18 innings. However, Strickland set a postseason record for a reliever by allowing six home runs, even though the Giants went on to defeat the Kansas City Royals in the 2014 World Series.

2015
Strickland started the 2015 season with the Triple-A Sacramento River Cats, posting a 1.66 ERA in 21.2 innings, before being called up on May 24, 2015.  Strickland did not yield a home run until August 3, a string of 188 batters between Triple-A and the majors. In 2015, Strickland appeared in 55 games, recording a 2.45 ERA with 50 strikeouts in 51.1 innings pitched.  Strickland's 0.857 WHIP was the third-lowest among relievers with at least 50 innings pitched.

2016
In 2016, Strickland was named to the opening day Major League roster for the first time in his career. He remained in the Giants bullpen throughout the season, collecting an ERA in the low 3's.

2017
In a May 29, 2017, game against the Washington Nationals, Strickland hit Bryce Harper's right hip with a 98-mph fastball, which resulted in a benches-clearing brawl. Strickland had to be physically removed from the field by teammates after exchanging several punches with Harper. He received widespread criticism for his role in starting the brawl, as sports analysts and Harper have suggested that the intentional hit-by-pitch was the result of a grudge from the two home runs by Harper against him in the 2014 National League Division Series, a series the Giants ended up winning in 4 games en route to a World Series championship. The next day, on May 30, he was suspended for six games.

2018
With Mark Melancon heading to the disabled list at the beginning of the season, Strickland was named the Giants closer.  He earned his first save in a 1-0 victory on Opening Day against the Los Angeles Dodgers. While playing against the Miami Marlins on June 18, Strickland allowed three runs, blowing a save, and the Giants lost 5–4. Shortly after a pitching change, Strickland punched a door out of frustration, which wound up fracturing his right hand. Strickland underwent surgery the next day, when the pinkie finger on his right hand was repaired. Strickland was ruled out for 6-8 weeks.

Seattle Mariners
On January 24, 2019, Strickland signed a one-year deal with the Seattle Mariners. On March 30, Strickland suffered a Grade 2 right lat strain, which put him out for a couple of months.

Washington Nationals
On July 31, 2019, the Mariners traded Strickland and Roenis Elías to the Washington Nationals in exchange for Aaron Fletcher, Taylor Guilbeau, and Elvis Alvarado. In 24 games with the Nationals, Strickland went 2-0 with a 5.14 ERA. Overall in 2019, combined with both teams, Strickland made 28 total relief appearances with a 2-1 record and a 5.55 ERA. The Nationals finished the 2019 year with a 93-69 record, clinching a wild card spot, and eventually went on to win the 2019 World Series over the Houston Astros, their first championship in franchise history. It was also the second time Strickland won a World Series in his career. During the NLDS against the Los Angeles Dodgers, he gave up his 9th career postseason home run, a record for relief pitchers. He was released by the Nationals on March 14, 2020.

New York Mets
On June 29, 2020, Strickland signed a minor league contract with the New York Mets organization. On July 23, it was announced that Strickland had made the Opening Day roster for the Mets. On July 30, Strickland was designated for assignment when Brian Dozier was added to the roster. He was outrighted on August 2. On August 31, 2020, Strickland was selected back to the active roster. Strickland's contract was selected on August 31 adding him to the active roster. That night he threw a scoreless inning of relief with two strikeouts, but was designated for assignment again the next day. Strickland elected free agency on October 15, 2020.

Tampa Bay Rays
On February 2, 2021, Strickland signed a minor league contract with the Tampa Bay Rays organization. On April 9, 2021, Strickland was selected to the 40-man roster. In 13 games for Tampa Bay, Strickland recorded a 1.69 ERA.

Los Angeles Angels
On May 15, 2021, Strickland was traded to the Los Angeles Angels in exchange for cash considerations or a player to be named later. In 9 appearances for the Angels, Strickland struggled to a 9.95 ERA before being designated for assignment on June 7.

Milwaukee Brewers
On June 12, 2021, Strickland was traded to the Milwaukee Brewers in exchange for cash considerations.

Cincinnati Reds
On March 23, 2022, Strickland signed a one-year contract with the Cincinnati Reds. He made 66 appearances for Cincinnati in 2022, pitching to a 3-3 record and 4.91 ERA with 60 strikeouts and 7 saves in 62.1 innings of work.

On February 18, 2023, Strickland re-signed with the Reds on a minor league contract.

Personal life
Strickland married Shelley Todd in November 2011. The couple had their first child, a daughter, in April 2017.

References

External links

1988 births
Living people
People from Thomaston, Georgia
Baseball players from Georgia (U.S. state)
Major League Baseball pitchers
San Francisco Giants players
Seattle Mariners players
Washington Nationals players
New York Mets players
Tampa Bay Rays players
Los Angeles Angels players
Milwaukee Brewers players
Cincinnati Reds players
Gulf Coast Red Sox players
Lowell Spinners players
Greenville Drive players
West Virginia Power players
Bradenton Marauders players
Altoona Curve players
San Jose Giants players
Richmond Flying Squirrels players
Sacramento River Cats players
Tacoma Rainiers players
Toros del Este players
American expatriate baseball players in the Dominican Republic